Epsomite, Epsom salt, or magnesium sulfate heptahydrate, is a hydrous magnesium sulfate mineral with formula MgSO4·7H2O.

Epsomite crystallizes in the orthorhombic system as rarely found acicular or fibrous crystals, the normal form is as massive encrustations. It is colorless to white with tints of yellow, green and pink. The Mohs hardness is 2 to 2.5 and it has a low specific gravity of 1.67.

It is readily soluble in water. It absorbs water from the air and converts to hexahydrate with the loss of one water molecule and a switch to monoclinic structure.

Etymology
It was first systematically described in 1806 for an occurrence near Epsom, Surrey, England, after which it was named.

Discovery and occurrence
Epsomite forms as encrustations or efflorescences on limestone cavern walls and mine timbers and walls, rarely as volcanic fumarole deposits, and as rare beds in evaporite layers such as those found in certain bodies of salt water. It occurs in association with melanterite, Gypsum, halotrichite, pickeringite, alunogen, rozenite and mirabilite.

Related minerals
The epsomite group includes solid solution series with morenosite (NiSO4·7H2O) and goslarite (ZnSO4·7H2O)

Research
Research on topical magnesium (for example epsom salt baths) is very limited. The Epsom Salt Council recommends bathing 2 or 3 times/week, using 500-600g (18 to 22 oz) Epsom salts each time.

See also
 Magnesium sulfate
 Bath salts

References

Mineral galleries

Magnesium minerals
Sulfate minerals
Cave minerals
Orthorhombic minerals
Minerals in space group 19
Evaporite